Bertrand is a given name and surname. In German, the name derives from berht ("bright") and hramn ("raven") or rand ("rim of shield").

Geographical distribution
As of 2014, 56.3% of all known bearers of the surname Bertrand were residents of France (frequency 1:902), 13.4% of Canada (1:2,103), 12.5% of the United States (1:22,092), 6.2% of Belgium (1:1,416) and 4.1% of Haiti (1:1,991).

In France, the frequency of the surname was higher than national average (1:902) in the following regions:
 1. Auvergne-Rhône-Alpes (1:675)
 2. Occitanie (1:686)
 3. Grand Est (1:693)
 4. Centre-Val de Loire (1:722)
 5. Provence-Alpes-Côte d'Azur (1:748)
 6. Nouvelle-Aquitaine (1:792)
 7. Bourgogne-Franche-Comté (1:836)

Given name 

 Bertrand Baguette (born 1986), Belgian racing driver
 Bertrand Barère (1755–1841), French politician, freemason and journalist, one of the members of National Convention and leaders of Reign of Terror 
 Bertrand de Bar-sur-Aube (late twelfth-early thirteenth century), French poet
 Bertrand Berry (born 1975), American football player
 Bertrand Blier (born 1939), a French director and screenwriter
 Bertrand Cantat (born 1964), French songwriter, singer, and musician
 Bertrand Clausel (1772–1842), Marshal of France, one of the principal commanders of Hundred Days War and Battle of Salamanca
 Bertrand of Comminges (1050–1126), saint and Bishop of Comminges
 Bertrand Crasson (born 1971), Belgian footballer
 Bertrand Damaisin (born 1968), French judoka
 Bertrand Delanoë (born 1950), French politician
 Bertrand Gachot (born 1962), Franco-Belgian racing driver
 Bertrand du Guesclin (c. 1320–1380), Constable of France
 Bertrand H. Hoak (1917–1987), New York state senator
 Bertrand de Jouvenel (1903-1987), French philosopher and political economist
 Bertrand Lacaste (1897–1994), French clergyman and bishop
 Bertrand Meyer (born 1950), computer scientist and author
 Bertrand Nagymartoni (fl. 1243–1276), Aragonese-Hungarian nobleman
 Prince Bertrand of Orléans-Braganza (born 1941), member of the Imperial House of Brazil
 Bertrand Owundi (born 1993), Cameroonian footballer
 Bertrand de Poulengy (fl. c. 1392–1456), French nobleman
 Bertrand Ract-Madoux (born 1953), French Army general
 Bertrand Russell (1872–1970), British philosopher, logician, mathematician, historian, writer, essayist, social critic, political activist, and Nobel laureate
 Bertrand Serlet, a senior vice president of software engineering at Apple Inc.
 Bertrand Tavernier, a French director, screenwriter, actor, and producer

Fictional characters 
 Bertrand Baudelaire, a fictional character in A Series of Unfortunate Events
 Bertrand Caillet, the protagonist of Guy Endore's novel The Werewolf of Paris
 Bertrand, a monkey in the fable of The Monkey and the Cat
 Bertrand de Gervaise, a character in Etrian Odyssey 2 Untold: The Fafnir Knight

Surname 
 Alexandre Bertrand (1820–1902), French archaeologist
 Alexandre Jacques François Bertrand (1795–1831), French physician
 Aloysius Bertrand (1807–1841), French poet
 Antoine de Bertrand (c. 1540 – c. 1580), French composer
 Charles Bertrand (disambiguation), multiple people
 Christophe Bertrand (1981-2010), French composer
 Claude Bertrand (actor) (1919–1986), French actor
 Claudine Bertrand (born 1948), Canadian educator and poet
 Émile Bertrand (1844–1909), French mineralogist
 Gabriel Bertrand (1867–1962), French biochemist and bacteriologist
 Gustave Bertrand (1896 – 1976), French intelligence officer
 Guy Bertrand (broadcaster) (born 1954), French Canadian linguist and radio/TV personality
 Guy Bertrand (chemist), professor at UC Riverside and carbene specialist
 Guy Bertrand (lawyer), Québec lawyer and political activist
 Henri Gatien Bertrand (1773–1844), French general (First Empire)
 Henri Bertrand (entomologist) (1892–1978), French entomologist
 Jacob Bertrand (born 2000), American actor known for his roles in Cobra Kai and Kirby Buckets
 Jean-Jacques Bertrand (1916–1973), Premier of Quebec (1968–1970)
 Jean-Michel Bertrand (1943–2008), French politician
 John Bertrand (Australian sailor) (born 1946), Australian yachtsman
 Joseph Bertrand (1822–1900), French mathematician
 Julie Winnefred Bertrand (1891–2007), one-time oldest recognized woman in the world
 Léon Bertrand (born 1951), French politician
 Louis Bertrand (disambiguation), multiple people with the name
 Marcel Alexandre Bertrand (1847–1907), French geologist
 Marcheline Bertrand, (1950–2007) American actress of French-Canadian descent and mother of Angelina Jolie
 Marianne Bertrand, Belgian economist at the University of Chicago
 Paul Bertrand (1879–1944), French botanist
 Plastic Bertrand (born 1958), Belgian singer
 Raymond Bertrand de Got (1264-1314), became Pope Clement V
 Robert Bertrand (born 1953), Canadian politician
 Robert R. Bertrand (1906–2002), American sound engineer
 Ryan Bertrand (born 1989), English footballer
 Sylvia Judith Bertrand (1930-2009), Dominican civil servant 
 Xavier Bertrand (born 1965), French politician
 Yann Arthus-Bertrand (born 1946), French photographer
 Yves Bertrand (1944–2013), French intelligence officer

References

French masculine given names
French-language surnames
Germanic-language surnames
Surnames of French origin
German masculine given names
English masculine given names